Trivigno is a town and comune in the province of Potenza, in the Southern Italian region of Basilicata.

It is the birthplace of the silent film actor and director Robert G. Vignola.

References

Cities and towns in Basilicata